Sanjay Krishnamurthi (born  2 June 2003) is an American cricketer who plays for the United States cricket team. In June 2021, he was selected to take part in the Minor League Cricket tournament in the United States following the players' draft. In September 2021, Krishnamurthi was named as a reserve player in the United States' One Day International (ODI) squad for the rescheduled tri-series in Oman. Following an injury to team-mate Aaron Jones, Krishnamurthi was added to the main ODI squad for the tour. He made his ODI debut on 13 September 2021, for the United States against Nepal.

References

External links
 

1989 births
Living people
American cricketers
United States One Day International cricketers
Sportspeople from Corvallis, Oregon
American sportspeople of Indian descent